Chicken Run is a platform-stealth based 3-D platform video game based on the 2000 film of the same name. The game is a loose parody of the famous film The Great Escape, which is set during World War II. The Game Boy Color version is a 2D isometric puzzle-solving game. The game's plot is about chickens escaping from a farm from their evil owners and fighting for freedom.

While characters, mainly Ginger and Rocky, were voiced by professional voice artists, Benjamin Whitrow and Lynn Ferguson reprised their roles as Fowler and Mac.

Gameplay

Dreamcast/PC/Playstation version 
Gameplay generally consists of the player taking control of either Ginger, Rocky, or Nick and Fetcher, and searching the Tweedys' farm for objects to be used in an escape attempt by the chickens.

This section of the game features stealth gameplay not too different from Metal Gear Solid, as the player will have to avoid guard dogs and the Tweedys themselves, in addition to searchlights, sources of light in general and noisy surfaces, since these will alert the security to the player's presence.

Should the player be caught, they will be sent back to the entry point of the current area, and will lose either their most recently obtained item or their currently equipped item which goes back to where it was originally found. In addition, the player will occasionally have to push objects about, or use the environment in order to get to a hard-to-reach item.

Each act ends with a boss level. In Act 1, the chickens have to control a mannequin of Mrs Tweedy. The Act 2 boss is a linear platforming level where Rocky has to avoid hazards to get to Ginger in the pie machine. In the Act 3 boss the chickens fly the 'Old Crate' and have to stop Mrs. Tweedy from reaching the top of the rope hanging from it.

The second two acts contain minigames representing an escape attempt, which in Act 2 involves launching chickens over the fence with a seesaw, catapult or fireworks. In Act 3, the minigames involve assembling a part of the 'Old Crate' and getting its engine running. Act 3 also contains a minigame in which the player has to get the hens in Hut 2 to lay eggs to pay Nick and Fetcher though this can also be played in the first two acts but without the player getting to keep the eggs.

Success is generally measured by how many chickens the player can save, or how fast the player can finish the task and the player can be awarded with bronze, silver or gold medals by Fowler for good performance.

GameBoy Color version 
The GameBoy Color version is very different in which the player controls Ginger who has to lure the chickens to the exit of each level using corn while avoiding the dogs and searchlights in the chicken coop and the magic eyes and laser beams in the pie machine within the time limits. Upon completing a level, the player is awarded medals by Fowler which act as the password to access the next level should the player turn off the console before reaching it. New items are made available as the player progresses through the game.

Plot 
In keeping with the film's story, the game takes place on a British chicken farm and follows a group of chickens as they try to break out of confinement.

Players must help Ginger and her flock make a break for freedom, while avoiding the evil Mrs. Tweedy and her oafish man Mr. Tweedy, who wants to turn them into chicken pies.

Reception 

The PlayStation version received "generally favorable reviews", while the Dreamcast and PC versions received "mixed or average reviews", according to the review aggregation website Metacritic. 

Kevin Rice of NextGen said of the Dreamcast version: "This is a surprisingly good conversion of a movie into a game. It's graphically brilliant in its similarities to the movie, and the gameplay is smart."

References

External links 
 Official website
 
 

2000 video games
3D platform games
Cancelled Nintendo 64 games
Chicken Run
Dreamcast games
Eidos Interactive games
Game Boy Color games
Platform games
PlayStation (console) games
THQ games
Aardman Animations video games
Stealth video games
Video games about birds
Video games based on films
Video games scored by Allister Brimble
Video games set in Yorkshire
Video games featuring female protagonists
Windows games
Single-player video games
Video games developed in the United Kingdom
Blitz Games Studios games